Pterostylis lineata,  commonly known as the Blue Mountains leafy greenhood,  is a plant in the orchid family Orchidaceae and is endemic to New South Wales. As with similar greenhoods, the flowering plants differ from those which are not flowering. The non-flowering plants have a rosette of leaves on a short stalk but the flowering plants lack a rosette and have up to seven dark green flowers with translucent "windows" on a flowering stem with stem leaves. The labellum is light brown with a black strip along its mid-line.

Description
Pterostylis lineata, is a terrestrial,  perennial, deciduous, herb with an underground tuber. The dorsal sepal and petals are joined to form a hood called the "galea" over the column. Flowering occurs from August to October.

Taxonomy and naming
The Blue Mountains leafy greenhood was first formally described in 2006 by David Jones who gave it the name Bunochilus lineatus. The description was published in Australian Orchid Research from a specimen collected near Woodford in the Blue Mountains. In 2010, Gary Backhouse changed the name to Pterostylis lineata. The specific epithet (lineata) is a Latin word meaning "marked with a linear line", referring to the markings on the labellum.

Distribution and habitat
Pterostylis lineata grows in moist soil in wet forest from the western side of the Blue Mountains to Lithgow and on the southern part of the Northern Tablelands.

References

lineata
Endemic orchids of Australia
Orchids of New South Wales
Plants described in 2006